Katha moorei is a moth of the family Erebidae first described by John Henry Leech in 1890. It is found in China.

References

Moths described in 1890
Lithosiina